Brita Olofsdotter (died 1569), was a Finnish soldier of the Swedish cavalry. She is the likely first confirmed female soldier in Sweden, as well as the first confirmed Swedish example of the historical phenomena of women impersonating men to gain access to professions barred to their gender.   

Olofsdotter was from Finland and was the widow of Nils Simonsson. She dressed as a man and enlisted during the Livonian War, where she served in the cavalry and was killed in battle. On 16 June 1569, John III of Sweden ordered Gabriel Christiensson to investigate the matter, and gave the order that her remaining salary should be paid to her family.

References 
 Eva Borgström : Makalösa kvinnor; könsöverskridare i myt och verklighet (Marvelous women; transgender in myth and reality), Alfabet. (2002)  
 Wilhelmina Stålberg: Anteckningar om svenska qvinnor (Notes of Swedish women)  

16th-century births
1569 deaths
Female wartime cross-dressers
Finnish women in war
Swedish soldiers
Women in 16th-century warfare
Women in war in Sweden
16th-century Swedish military personnel